The 48th Karlovy Vary International Film Festival took place from 28 June to 6 July 2013. The Crystal Globe was won by The Notebook, a Hungarian drama film directed by János Szász. The second prize, the Special Jury Prize was won by A Field in England, a British historical psychological horror film directed by Ben Wheatley. Polish film and television director and screenwriter Agnieszka Holland was the Grand Jury President of the festival.

Juries
The following people formed the juries of the festival: 
Main competition
 Agnieszka Holland, Grand Jury President (Poland)
 Ivo Andrle (Czech Republic)
 Frédéric Boyer (France)
 Alon Garbuz (Israel)
 Claudia Llosa (Peru)
 Meenakshi Shedde (India)
 Sigurjón Sighvatsson (Iceland)
Documentaries
 Krzysztof Gierat, Chairman (Poland)
 Maria Bonsanti (Italy)
 Martin Mareček (Czech Republic)
 Sergio Oksman (Spain)
 Andrea Reuter (Sweden)
East of the West
 Éva Vezér, Chairwoman (Hungary)
 Peter Paul Huth (Germany)
 Maja Miloš (Serbia)
 Piotr Mularuk (Poland)
 Sergej Stanojkovski (Germany)

Official selection awards

The following feature films and people received the official selection awards:
 Crystal Globe (Grand Prix) -  The Notebook (A nagy füzet) by János Szász (Hungary, Germany, Austria, France)
 Special Jury Prize - A Field in England by Ben Wheatley (United Kingdom)
 Best Director Award - Jan Hřebejk for Honeymoon (Líbánky) (Czech Republic, Slovak Republic)
 Best Actress Award (ex aequo) - Amy Morton, Louisa Krause, Emily Meade, and Margo Martindale for their roles in Bluebird (USA, Sweden)
 Best Actor Award - Ólafur Darri Ólafsson for his role in XL (Iceland)
 Special mention of the jury - Papusza by Joanna Kos-Krauze & Krzysztof Krauze (Poland)

Other statutory awards
Other statutory awards that were conferred at the festival:
 Best documentary film (over 30 min) -  Pipeline (Truba) by Vitaly Manskiy (Russia, Germany, Czech Republic)
 Special Mention -  The Manor by Shawney Cohen (Canada)
 Best documentary film (under 30 min) -  Beach Boy by Emil Langballe (United Kingdom)
 East of the West Award - Floating Skyscrapers (Płynące wieżowce) by Tomasz Wasilewski (Poland)
 Special Mention -  Miracle (Zázrak) by Juraj Lehotský (Slovak Republic, Czech Republic)
 Crystal Globe for Outstanding Artistic Contribution to World Cinema - Theodor Pištěk (Czech Republic), Oliver Stone (USA), John Travolta (USA)
 Festival President's Award - Vojtěch Jasný (Czech Republic)
 Audience Award - Revival by Alice Nellis (Czech Republic)

Non-statutory awards
The following non-statutory awards were conferred at the festival:
 FIPRESCI International Critics Award: Shame (Styd) by Yusup Razykov (Russia)
 Ecumenical Jury Award: Bluebird by Lance Edmands (USA, Sweden)
 FEDEORA Award (East of the West section): Velvet Terrorists by Ivan Ostrochovský, Pavol Pekarčík, Peter Kerekes (Slovak Republic, Czech Republic, Croatia) 
 Europa Cinemas Label: The Notebook (A nagy füzet) by János Szász (Hungary, Germany, Austria, France)

References

2013 film awards
2013